Sinister Hands is a 1932 American pre-Code film directed by Armand Schaefer.

Plot summary 
A millionaire is murdered at a séance at a fortune-teller's home. Detective Capt Herbert Devlin, played by Jack Mulhall, and Detective Watkins investigate the crime only to discover all attendees have a motive.

Cast 
Jack Mulhall as Detective Capt. Herbert Devlin
Phyllis Barrington as Ruth Frazer
Crauford Kent as Judge David McLeod
Mischa Auer as Swami Yomurda
Louis Natheaux as Nick Genna
Gertrude Messinger as Betty Lang
Lloyd Ingraham as John Frazer
James P. Burtis as Detective Watkins
Phillips Smalley as Richard Lang
Helen Foster as Vivian Rogers
Lillian West as Mrs. Lang
Fletcher Norton as Monroe, the Butler
Bess Flowers as Mary Browne

References

External links 

1932 films
American mystery films
American black-and-white films
Films directed by Armand Schaefer
1932 mystery films
1930s English-language films
1930s American films